The AIMA prophecy was a prophecy current during the reign of the Byzantine emperor, Manuel I Komnenos and at the same time an example of a medieval contrived acronym. 

It claimed to foretell that the initial letters of the names of the emperors of the Komnenos dynasty would spell aima (αἶμα), the Greek word for "blood". The emperors of the dynasty had been, in order, Alexios I Komnenos (alpha), Ioannes II Komnenos (iota), and Manuel I (mu) (whose succession was unexpected since he was the fourth son of Ioannes). Because of his belief that his successor's name would have to start with the letter alpha, Manuel had the name Alexios bestowed on Béla, the fiancé of his daughter Maria and his designated heir from 1168 to 1169, when his second wife bore Manuel a son, who was named again in accordance with the prophecy as Alexios II Komnenos, rather than Ioannes after his paternal grandfather, as was customary among the Byzantines. Manuel also gave the name to at least one and perhaps two of his own illegitimate sons.

The reign of Alexios II lasted only three years, before he was deposed and killed by his cousin, Andronikos I Komnenos, with whom, apparently, the AIMA sequence began again. In accordance with this, Andronikos would be succeeded in turn by an emperor whose name began with the letter iota. For that reason, he bypassed his firstborn son Manuel Komnenos in favour of the younger Ioannes, who was crowned co-emperor in 1184.  Andronikos also feared his throne would be usurped by another cousin, Isaac Komnenos of Cyprus. Stephen Hagiochristophorites, the Logothete of the Drome, suspected a different Isaac, Isaac II Angelos, who had been seen in Constantinople. On September 11, 1185 Hagiochristophorites visited Isaac Angelos at his hideout. Isaac Angelos slew Hagiochristophorites with his sword and fled to Hagia Sophia seeking sanctuary. In the ensuing uprising, Isaac was crowned emperor, while Andronikos was overthrown and killed a few days later.

The AIMA line continued, however, from Andronikos' eldest son Manuel to his own descendants—the only male-line branch of the Komnenoi to survive the 12th century—the "Grand Komnenoi" emperors of Trebizond: Andronikos I, Ioannes as co-emperor, Manuel, who would have been the legitimate successor, and Manuel's son Alexios I Megas Komnenos, founder of the Empire of Trebizond. The sequence re-appears again with Andronikos I Gidos, Ioannes I Axouchos, Manuel Megas Komnenos, and Andronikos II Megas Komnenos.

References

Sources
 
 
 

 

Prophecy
Komnenos dynasty
Manuel I Komnenos